John Young House may refer to:

John Young House (Geetingsville, Indiana)
John W. Young Round Barn, Traer, Iowa
Belmont Club (Fall River, Massachusetts), also known as the John Young House
John Quincy Adams Young House, Cedar Mill, Oregon
John Eben Young House, Portland, Oregon
John Young House (Muscoda, Wisconsin)

See also
Young House (disambiguation)